The Imhoff-Schokoladenmuseum (Imhoff chocolate museum) was opened by Hans Imhoff on 31 October 1993. It is situated in the Cologne quarter of Altstadt-Süd on the Rheinauhafen peninsula. The exhibits show the entire history of chocolate, from its beginnings with the Olmecs, Maya and Aztecs to contemporary products and production methods.

With 5,000 guided tours and 675,000 visitors a year, the museum is in the Top Ten of German museums. The museum is entirely self-supporting, receiving no subsidy. It has its own marketing department and is used by the Schokoladenmuseum Gastronomie GmbH for events.

Operator 
The museum is run by the Schokoladenmuseum Köln GmbH. Since March 2006, the Swiss chocolate manufacturer Lindt & Sprüngli has been its partner in producing exhibits. Prior to that the partner was the Cologne chocolate producer Stollwerck, and the museum was formerly known as the Imhoff-Stollwerck-Museum.

Attractions 
 A small tropicarium, open to visitors, consisting of a glass cube 10 metres square houses cacao trees of the species Theobroma cacao and Theobroma grandiflorum. 
 Miniature versions of machines used in the production of chocolate, allowing visitors to observe the process of making the small chocolate bars which are given out at the entrance.
 A special attraction is the 3-metre-high chocolate fountain; an employee dips wafers into the liquid chocolate and distributes them to the visitors.
 At the entrance of the museum is a shop with a wide range of chocolate products and pralines. In 2006, the chocolate museum entered a partnership deal with Lindt & Sprüngli, therefore most of the products in the shop are by this manufacturer. This deal succeeded its previous one with the Cologne-based chocolate producer Stollwerck.

Among the most valuable items in the museum's collection are 18th and 19th-century porcelain and silver bowls and vessels for drinking chocolate from pre-Columbian Mesoamerica. The museum also has on display historical chocolate machines and moulds for forming chocolate in different shapes, and a collection of historical chocolate vending machines.

References

External links 

 Official museum website 

Chocolate museums
Museums in Cologne
Innenstadt, Cologne
Museums established in 1993
Food museums in Germany
1993 establishments in Germany